The College of the Environment at Western Washington University is one of the oldest environmental colleges in the US.

Departments and programs
The college has two departments, Environmental Science and Environmental Studies, and offers a variety of undergraduate and graduate degrees.

Undergraduate degrees
 B.S. in Environmental Science
 B.A. in Environmental Studies, Environmental Policy, Geography, Environmental Education, and Urban Planning and Sustainable Development
B.A. and B.S. in Energy Studies (with the College of Business and Economics and the College of Science and Engineering)
B.A. in Business and Sustainability (with the College of Business and Economics)
 Combined degrees in Environmental Studies-Elementary Education (B.A.E.), Geography-Elementary Education (B.A.E.), Geography-Social Studies (B.A.), and Economics-Environmental Studies (B.A.)

Graduate degrees
 M.S. Environmental Science
 M.A. in EnvironmentaL Studies
M.S. in Marine and Estuarine Science (MESP)
 M.Ed. in Environmental Education

Alumni
Over 7,500 students have graduated from the College of the Environment, many going on to work in various environmental-related industries including: habitat biology, renewable energy, environmental education, and more. Alumni are represented in the senior levels of various local, state, and federal institutions.

References

External links
Official site

Western Washington University